Chatmongkol Thongkiri (born May 5, 1997) is a Thai professional footballer who plays as a defensive midfielder for Thai League 1 club BG Pathum United.

Club

Honours

Club
BG Pathum United
 Thailand Champions Cup (1): 2021, 2022

References

External links
 

1997 births
Living people
Chatmongkol Thongkiri
Chatmongkol Thongkiri
Association football midfielders
Chatmongkol Thongkiri
Chatmongkol Thongkiri
Chatmongkol Thongkiri
Chatmongkol Thongkiri